Gordon Dreyer (1 June 1914 – 5 February 2003) was an English professional footballer who played in the Football League for Hartlepools United, Luton Town and Hull City as a wing half.

Career statistics

References 

Clapton Orient F.C. wartime guest players
English Football League players
English footballers
Association football wing halves
1914 births
2003 deaths
People from Whitburn, Tyne and Wear
Footballers from Tyne and Wear
Washington Colliery F.C. players
Hartlepool United F.C. players
Hull City A.F.C. players
Luton Town F.C. players
Cheltenham Town F.C. players
Bedford Town F.C. players
Ebbsfleet United F.C. players
Rushden Town F.C. players
Southern Football League players
Watford F.C. wartime guest players